Richard Thomas Potter (January 20, 1915 – February 16, 2009) was a politician in Ontario, Canada. He was a Progressive Conservative  member of the Legislative Assembly of Ontario from 1967 to 1975 who represented the eastern Ontario riding of Quinte. He served as a cabinet minister in the government of Bill Davis.

Background
He was educated locally and attended Queen's University from which institution he graduated as a Physician in 1939. He immediately enlisted as a military medic in the Royal Canadian Army Medical Corps and used his experience and expertise as a doctor to treat soldiers who were injured as a result of battles they fought in Europe. He served in an advance mobile unit to care for the injured of war; at the time of discharge he held the rank of lieutenant colonel. Potter returned to Belleville following his military service and worked as a family doctor and anesthetist. He married Enid Grace Weaver and together they raised four children.

Politics
In 1950 he entered municipal politics when he was elected as Alderman in Belleville and ran for Mayor and was elected to that office in 1951, running on a campaign promise to establish a municipal health unit and expand community facilities.

In the 1967 provincial election, Potter ran as the Progressive Conservative candidate in Quinte. He defeated Ronald Joss of the Liberal party by 4,092 votes. He was re-elected in 1971. In 1971, when Bill Davis became Premier, he appointed Potter to cabinet as a Minister without portfolio. A year later he was promoted to Minister of Health. In 1974 he was shuffled to Minister of Correctional Services.

Cabinet positions

Later life
He decided to retire from politics at the age of 60 in 1975 having brought some badly needed changes in the health and welfare departments. In 1976 he was appointed as regional coroner which required him to close his private medical practice and serve as a full-time public servant. He died in Oakville, Ontario after he and his wife moved to a nursing home to be closer to their grandchildren.

References

External links
 

1915 births
2009 deaths
Mayors of Belleville, Ontario
Members of the Executive Council of Ontario
Progressive Conservative Party of Ontario MPPs
Canadian coroners